Lea Hall is an area in the east of Birmingham, England, bordering the Kitts Green and Garretts Green areas.

It is the location of Lea Hall railway station, which is served by West Midlands Trains.  The local primary school is Lea Forest Academy School.

It should not be confused with Lea Hall, a building in nearby Handsworth, and its associated features, such as Lea Hall allotments.

External links
1888 Ordnance Survey map of Lea Hall

Areas of Birmingham, West Midlands